Paws, Bones & Rock'n'roll (meaning Shaggy Christmas Trees), is a 2015 Russian children's comedy film, spin-off from Yolki, featuring the dogs Pirate and Yoko, which appeared in Yolki 3.

Plot
Samara resident Nastya, mistress of the dogs Pirate and Yoko, flies with her grandmother to St. Petersburg, and leaves her pets in the hotel for dogs, where two thieves, Makar (a hotel employee) and Lyokha (a dog dealer in a market that is not in the best of terms with the authorities) - decide to break in to the houses of the wealthy dog owners, including Nastya's parents. Pirate and Yoko resist going to the hotel, but no matter how hard they try, they are still left there. Dissatisfied with this, the dogs run away. Walking around the city, they return home, where they can do their favorite things - eat as much they want, play tirelessly and sleep on the master's bed. But the thieves have already arrived at the house.

Seeing uninvited guests, Pirate and Yoko turn on the TV so that thieves think that someone is in the house. Even in the afternoon, Nastya and her grandmother are detained at the airport. The police release them for the next flight. Nastya tries to contact the hotel staff, and they try to calm her down. Arriving in St. Petersburg, Nastya escapes. Nastya's frightened grandmother announces to the police about the disappearance of the child. In Samara, dogs and thieves fight each other. Nastya finds the dogs and thieves. The thieves leave the dogs and kidnap Nastya. They try to hide in the van, but Pirate attacks them and the wagon capsizes near the patrol car. As a result, the police detain the thieves, and Nastya with her family and dogs celebrate the New Year. The further fate of the thieves is revealed in the movie Yolki 5. Boris Vorobyov buys a penguin from Makar, who is on the phone with Lyokha. From the conversation it turns out that after they were detained, they were both facing prison sentences, but Lyokha then took all the blame on himself. Makar is released and gets a job as a salesperson.

Cast
Aisa Animal Art — Pirate
Femmy — Yoko
Andrey Merzlikin — Lyokha, thief
Yan Tsapnik — Makar, thief
Valeriya Strelayeva — Nastya
Galina Konshina — Nastya's grandmother
Viktor Vasiliev — manager of the hotel for dogs
Andrei Fedortsov — bus driver
Pyotr Fyodorov— Kolya, Nastya's father
Anna Chipovskaya — Lena, Nastya's mother
Igor Vlasov — Cheburek
Sergei Troev — Banan

References

External links
 

2010s children's comedy films
2010s crime comedy-drama films
Russian children's comedy films
Russian crime comedy-drama films
Films set around New Year
Russian sequel films
Films about dogs
Bazelevs Company films
2010s Russian-language films